Bret Smith (born January 14, 1985) is a former wide receiver. He played college football at Tennessee.

High school
Smith attended Warren High School.  He was named a high school All-American by Parade and SuperPrep reporting services. Smith played in the U.S. Army All-American Bowl and won two high school state championships.

College
Smith caught 18 passes for 291 in 2004 and caught 21 passes for 223 yards in 2005. His production increased in 2006. David Cutcliffe returned to Tennessee as offensive coordinator in 2006. With his return, Meachem, Swain, Smith and quarterback Erik Ainge all had career seasons. Smith finished the 2006 season with 35 receptions for 405 yards in 10 games but his college career ended with him being ruled academically ineligible for the Outback Bowl against Penn State.

Professional career

Dallas Desperdaos
Smith spent 2008 on the practice squad of the Arena Football League's Dallas Desperados. However, was released on June 30, 2008 along with Damarius Bilbo, Adrian Gonzalez, and Troy Mason.

Arkansas Diamonds
Smith played for the Arkansas Diamonds of the Indoor Football League.

Kansas City Command
Smith is currently playing for the Kansas City Command of the Arena Football League. He is the number two receiver on the team along with Steven Savoy. Together the two take passes from one of the top quarterbacks in the leagueJ. J. Raterink. As of the sixth game of the season, Smith had racked up 52 receptions for 612 yards and 10 touchdowns. The Command rank second in the league in passing.

Notes

External links
 Tennessee Volunteers bio
 Tennessee Volunteers Stats
 NCAA Official Receiving Statistics

1985 births
Living people
Sportspeople from Little Rock, Arkansas
American football wide receivers
Arkansas Diamonds players
Tennessee Volunteers football players
Dallas Desperados players
Kansas City Command players